Buchema interstrigata is a species of sea snail, a marine gastropod mollusk in the family Horaiclavidae.

Description
The length of the acuminate pyramidal shell varies between 7 mm and 12 mm. The shell consists of 7½ whorls of which 1½ in the protoconch. Each of the longitudinal ribs may be said to be composed of four transverse nodules, and those on the body whorl are bifurcate from the middle downwards. The lirae on the body whorl below the four principal ones are only slightly interrupted in the interstices between the ribs. The aperture is whitish near the outer lip. The sinus is small. The siphonal canal is very short.

Distribution
This marine species occurs from Panama to Eastern Brazil; also off the Virgin Islands; Saint Vincent, Martinique and Cuba.

References

 Maes, Virginia O., Observations on the Systematics and Biology of a Turrid Gastropod Assemblage in the British Virgin Islands; Bulletin of Marine Science, Volume 33, Number 2, April 1983, pp. 305-335 (31)

External links
  Tucker, J.K. 2004 Catalog of recent and fossil turrids (Mollusca: Gastropoda). Zootaxa 682:1–1295.
 

interstrigata
Gastropods described in 1882